We Like It Here is an album by American jazz fusion group Snarky Puppy that was released on February 25, 2014. The track "Lingus" includes a solo on the synthesizer performed by Cory Henry.

Track listing

Personnel
 Michael League – bass guitar, Moog bass
 Mike Maher – trumpet, flugelhorn
 Jay Jennings – trumpet, flugelhorn
 Chris Bullock – tenor saxophone, bass clarinet, flute
 Bob Reynolds – tenor saxophone
 Yannick Hiwat – violin
 Tessel Hersbach – violin
 Mara Tieles – viola
 Susanne Rosmolen – cello
 Bill Laurance – piano, keyboards
 Justin Stanton – keyboards, trumpet
 Cory Henry – keyboards
 Shaun Martin – Moog talkbox, keyboards
 Bob Lanzetti – electric guitar
 Mark Lettieri – electric guitar
 Chris McQueen – electric guitar, baritone guitar
 Larnell Lewis – drums
 Julio Pimental – percussion (tracks 4 and 7)
 Steven Brezet – percussion (tracks 4 and 7)
 Nate Werth – percussion

References 

2014 albums
Snarky Puppy albums